

Amanda Waller

Warhawk
Warhawk (Rex Stewart) is a fictional character created for the DC Animated Universe, voiced by Peter Onorati.

In the Batman Beyond two-part episode "The Call", Warhawk is a member of Justice League Unlimited (the Justice League of the future) alongside Big Barda, Green Lantern (Kai-Ro) and Aquagirl (Mareena). He was initially at odds with Batman (Terry McGinnis) because he had been recruited onto the team by Superman without the rest of the JLU's consent. But after Batman proved himself to be a competent and trustworthy member against Starro, Warhawk's attitude shifted from reluctant ally to devoted teammate. They would eventually become close comrades and colleagues.

In the animated series' related comics, Warhawk appeared in Batman Beyond issue #21 ("The Blackest Day - Part 1") when Batman teams up with the JLU in a high-voltage adventure as they battle new villain Blacklight.

Warhawk's next appearance was in Justice League Unlimited. In the season one finale "The Once and Future Thing, Part Two: Time Warped", Warhawk met the modern-day Green Lantern (John Stewart), the original Batman (Bruce Wayne) and Wonder Woman after Chronos sent them to the future. At that time, he is a member of the remaining future JLU members alongside Static (Virgil Hawkins) and Terry McGinnis. Warhawk later revealed that he is Rex Stewart, the son of John and Shayera Hol at the time his father was involved with Vixen after having broken up with his mother since the traumatic events of the episode "Starcrossed". Regardless, John bonds with his future son, even saving him from death during the battle with the Jokerz. After the cyclical causality erased memories of the team-up from the future JLUers and Wonder Woman, only John and Batman retained knowledge of Warhawk's existence. Learning Warhawk's future existence made John suffer indecision between the two women. John decided to keep this information a secret from Shayera to which Batman agreed.

Warhawk also appears in the second-season finale "Epilogue", again as a member of the JLU.

In the third-season episode "Ancient History", John finally informs Shayera that she is to become the mother of his child. This information briefly gives Shayera an ecstatic feeling of hope. But despite still loving Shayera, John decides to stay with Vixen and "refuses to be destiny's puppet", preferring to let things work themselves out. After this, Shayera asks Batman to tell her what he knows about her son.

Other versions of Warhawk
In Justice League of America (vol. 2) #25, the trickster god Anansi creates an alternate version of the DC Comics universe with many altered heroes. One of these heroes is an alternate version of Hawk that wears a red version of Warhawk's costume.

In September 2011, The New 52 rebooted DC's continuity. In the new timeline, the Warhawks are the Thanagarian military force. They are sent to earth to kill Hawkman and invade the planet.
In the 2015/2016 Batman Beyond series, Micron reveals to Tim Drake that he fought alongside Warhawk and Barda against Brother Eye's forces in Europe. Warhawk and Barda are converted by Brother Eye's forces and Micron is forced to escape. However, the Green Lantern Power Ring that Matt McGinnis was keeping leads him to a room containing Warhawk and the rest of the Justice League. Evil Factory member Abel Cuvier reveals that Brother Eye has the Justice League placed in stasis for potential future uses and implanted false memories and perceptions into Micron to shield the truth. Once they are freed, Warhawk and the Justice League are put under hypnosis and attack Tim, believing he is a Brother Eye cyborg. Warhawk and the Justice League are later freed from the mind-control.

Warlock's Daughter

Warlord

Warp

Waverider

Martha Wayne

Thomas Wayne

Van Wayne

Vanderveer "Van" Wayne is Bruce Wayne's rich and spoiled cousin. While visiting him, Van found the Robin costume in Alfred's laundry which Bruce claimed were his and Dick Grayson's masquerade costumes. He got himself into some trouble when he hired a con artist named Jumpy Regan to impersonate Batman, while he posed as Robin. He did all this with the intention of impressing Dick, but Van was not aware that they were, in fact, the real Dynamic Duo. Van had to be rescued from Regan by Batman and Robin and even helped to apprehend Regan. In the aftermath of the situation, he learned a lesson in humility.

Van Wayne in other media
Van Wayne appears in Powerless, portrayed by Alan Tudyk. This version is the head of Wayne Security, a subsidiary of Wayne Enterprises, in Charm City. A self-proclaimed "rich, over-educated, globetrotting wastrel", the megalomaniacal Van hates his job and seeks to move to Gotham City for a better position at the company.

Weapons Master

Weasel
Weasel is the name of two DC Comics supervillains. Weasel first appeared in The Fury of Firestorm #35 (August 1985), and was created for DC Comics by Gerry Conway and Rafael Kayanan.

John Monroe

John Monroe was a lonely student at Stanford University in the late 1960s. His contemporaries rarely noticed him. If they did, they referred to him in derogatory terms, using words like "Weasel" to describe him. This made him bitter, driving him to become a murderer decades later. The grown John Monroe became a teacher at Vandemeer University in Pittsburgh, Pennsylvania. A number of his fellow students from Stanford University held prominent positions. To rationalize killing three of them, he considered them threats to getting tenure at Vandemeer. Taking on the costumed identity of Weasel, displaying great agility, expertise at hand-to-hand combat, and a costume with sharp claws, he stalked the campus grounds and brutally murdered Arnold Lintel, Linda Walters, and a night guard named Chuck Gherkin. When Martin Stein (one half of Firestorm) shows up for a job opening as a physics professor, Monroe made two attempts on Martin Stein's life. In the second attempt, he would have killed Martin had he not provoked the transformation of Stein into Firestorm. After a fight, Firestorm unmasked Weasel and sent him to jail.

Weasel was later recruited into the Suicide Squad for their ill-fated mission to rescue Hawk. During the mission, he tried to kill the Thinker by cutting Thinker's throat with his claws. Rick Flag Jr. took the Thinker's helmet to regain control over the mission. When he saw the Weasel, the Thinker's helmet told Flag to kill him. Weasel's death was not mourned.

During the Blackest Night storyline, Weasel's dead body was seen to be among those entombed in the Hall of Justice. When the Black Power Rings flew in, Weasel's body was among the dead bodies that were reanimated by the Black Power Rings and inducted into the Black Lantern Corps.

In September 2011, The New 52 rebooted DC's continuity. In this new timeline, a slightly revised Jack Monroe Weasel is re-established in the Forever Evil storyline, depicted in a more animalistic state. He was lurking in Central Park when Steve Trevor and Killer Frost were looking for Cheetah (who was in possession of Wonder Woman's lasso). Weasel ambushed Steve Trevor and Killer Frost where he was frozen by a reluctant Killer Frost. Killer Frost told Steve Trevor that Weasel is considered a joke compared to villains Black Bison and Multiplex. Before Steve Trevor and Killer Frost press on, Killer Frost apologizes to Weasel.

Future Weasel
In Batman #666 (July 2007), a special issue set 15 years in the future, a different Weasel is shown as an enemy of Damian Wayne, who has become Batman following the death of Dick Grayson. This future Weasel has canine-like teeth.

Weasel in other media
 An unnamed, animalistic incarnation of the Weasel appears in the DC Extended Universe (DCEU) film The Suicide Squad, portrayed by Sean Gunn. He is recruited into the titular team to destroy a Corto Maltese prison called Jötunheim, but seemingly drowns while being airdropped onto the island's coast. In a mid-credits scene, he is revealed to have survived and flees into the local jungle.
 Weasel will appear in the HBO Max / DC Universe animated miniseries Creature Commandos as a member of the eponymous team.

Weather Witch
The Weather Witch is a character in DC Comics.

The Weather Witch was a former prostitute from Gotham City, transformed by the Penguin into a member of the New Rogues during the Gotham Underground storyline.

During the Final Crisis storyline, Libra sent her and the rest of the New Rogues after the Rogues when they withdrew from the Secret Society of Super Villains. She was not very skilled with her Weather Wand and the Weather Wizard easily killed her with a lightning bolt.

Weather Witch in other media
Joslyn Jackam / Weather Witch appears in live-action media set in the Arrowverse, portrayed by Reina Hardesty:
 She first appears in season five of The Flash. The estranged daughter of Mark Mardon / Weather Wizard, this version was a meteorologist who was fired after her weather experiments became too dangerous. A part of her van was struck with a fragment of the Thinker's Enlightenment satellite, which she converted into a staff that enables her to control the weather like her father and became the Weather Witch. After the Flash foils her plot to kill her father, she attempts to wreak havoc on Central City, but the Flash stops her using the Weather Wizard's wand and sees her imprisoned alongside her father. In the episode "The Flash & The Furious", the Weather Witch is put on trial, but expresses remorse for what she did and is prepared to serve time. However, the Silver Ghost frees her from the Central City Police Department's custody and persuades her to go on a crime spree with her by returning her staff. While XS persuades Weather Witch to stop, the latter escapes with the Silver Ghost. As of the episode "Gone Rogue", Weather Witch abandoned the Silver Ghost in Bolivia and joins up with XS, Brie Larvan and Rag Doll to rob McCulloch Technologies before they are defeated by the Flash and arrested by the authorities.
 The Weather Witch makes a minor appearance in the crossover "Crisis on Infinite Earths". After the multiverse was restored and Earth-Prime was created, she attacks National City and is confronted by Supergirl before the former is defeated by the Flash.

Weather Wizard

Web

Wedna
Wedna (also known as Wedna Kil-Gor) was a native of the planet Krypton and the daughter of the inventor of Kil-Gor. She first appeared in Krypton Chronicles #3 (September 1981).

Wedna married her father's colleague and friend Bur-El and gave a birth to his children Val-El and Tro-El, both who later became a noted explorers. Wedna is an ancestor of Kal-El, also known as Superman. Wedna passed away several centuries before the destruction of Krypton.

Wedna in other media
Wedna (renamed Wedna-El) appears in a flashback in the Krypton episode "Zods and Monsters", portrayed by Toni O'Rourke. This version is a scientist and member of the House of El who, alongside Van-Zod, experimented on a Sagitari soldier named Dax to turn him into a supersoldier due to its unique gene believed to be a key to end a civil war between Kandor and Argo. When Dax goes through a painful process in the chamber, Van beca omes concerned and tries to stop the project, but Wedna refuses as she believes they were doing a greater good. After 455 trials, Dax bthecomes Doomsday. When the war was over, Dax's wife Enaj demands them to see a husband, but they refuse as Dax was already transformed. Enaj leaves the laboratory after seeing him transformed to her horror.

Weeper

Weird

Paul Westfield

Whip

White Canary
During the Birds of Prey relaunch tie-in with the 2010 Brightest Day storyline, it is revealed that one of the female children born to Huang was spared after lightning appeared on the day of her birth and killed her midwife, making Huang believe that something powerful wanted her to live. She was trained by her brothers in the same techniques, and after their defeat at the hands of the Black Canary, she hunted them down and killed them for dishonoring their father's name. Now calling herself the White Canary, she traveled to Gotham and set out to blackmail the Black Canary by revealing her secret identity and threatening to kill one teammate for each hour that passed, enlisting the help of Oswald Cobblepot, Savant and Creote. Upon being defeated by the Black Canary, she denied being responsible for the death of a kidnapper in Iceland to frame the Black Canary, claiming that it was in fact Lady Shiva, and offers the Black Canary help in killing Shiva if she is set free.

Later, the White Canary takes the Black Canary to Bangkok and reveals that she is holding the Black Canary's adopted daughter Sin as a hostage, and will kill her if the Black Canary does not battle Lady Shiva in a duel to the death. The Black Canary agrees despite her broken wrist, but at the last minute Helena Bertinelli challenges Shiva in her place, buying the Black Canary enough time to find Sin and get her to safety, and Lady Shiva agrees to put their duel off until a later time. The White Canary reluctantly concedes, but promises that the Black Canary has not seen the last of her.

Alternate versions of White Canary
 The White Canary appears in the Ame-Comi Girls comic book series. This version is a superheroine instead of a supervillain and possesses the sonic scream known as the "Canary Cry". Like her previous appearances though, she is still of Asian descent and retains her anonymity.
 A different version of the White Canary appears in The New 52s Black Canary title. Debuting in issue #4 as an unnamed character in a white costume, she saves Ditto from Amanda Waller and returns her to Dinah in secret. She later reappears stealing a vial of blood from Dinah. Later, the still-unnamed woman helps the Black Canary defeat a monster and save her band and then appears to Dinah's house, revealing her identity. She is revealed as Dinah's maternal aunt, Rena, who wants to protect her niece from a threat related to her missing mother's past. At the end of the series' run, Rena is revealed as a fake, with the villainous shapeshifter Izak Orato masquerading as the Black Canary's "aunt" to trick her. Unlike previous incarnations, the character is depicted as Caucasian and blonde.

White Canary in other media
 In the Arrowverse, Sara Lance adopts the alias of the White Canary after being brought back from the dead with a Lazarus Pit and joined the Legends.
 Sara Lance's White Canary appears in the mobile edition of Injustice 2, as an alternate skin for the Black Canary.

White DragonWhite Dragon is the name of four different characters appearing in American comic books published by DC Comics.

White Dragon I
The first White Dragon is a gang leader who is an enemy of Whip on Earth-Two.

Wu ChengWu Cheng is a combat pilot who works as a member of the Blackhawk Squadron under the alias of White Dragon.

William HellerWilliam Heller is a Neo-Nazi and white supremacist who formed the Aryan Empire. While posing as a vigilante, William handed any Asian, Black, and/or Latino criminals to the police while sending the white criminals to the Aryan Empire headquarters. White Dragon's actions attracted the attention of the Suicide Squad. Deadshot infiltrated the Aryan Empire as a man named William Hell. Using Chronos' time machine, the Suicide Squad rigged the shooting contest between William Heller and Deadshot so that Deadshot would win while also tarnishing Heller.

Heller later wore a suit of armor and took on the alias of White Dragon where he joined the Fourth Reich in their goal to wipe out the original members of the Justice Society of America. he was defeated by Hawkman.

White Dragon later sided with General in his plan to overthrow Amanda Waller and kill the rest of the Suicide Squad. He was killed by Plastique.

Daniel DucannonDaniel Ducannon is a white supremacist who used the White Dragon name when posing as a vigilante after getting his pyrokinesis from the Meta-Bomb incident. While targeting people of color, White Dragon ran afoul of Hawkman and Hawkwoman. They defeated White Dragon with help from Carter Hall and Shiera Sanders Hall.

During the "Underworld Unleashed" storyline, White Dragon was among the escaped Belle Reve inmates that hear the offer of Neron.

During the "Joker: Last Laugh" storyline, White Dragon is among the inmates of Slabside Penitentiary that was Jokerized by Joker. He and Warjack were defeated by Militia.

White Dragon later appeared as a member of the Fourth Reich where he now rides an actual white dragon. White Dragon and his fellow Nazi villains attacked the Justice Society of America's headquarters and was defeated by them.

White Dragon in other media
An original version of the White Dragon with elements of the William Heller and Daniel Ducannon incarnations appears in the DC Extended Universe television series Peacemaker. This version is August "Auggie" Smith (portrayed by Robert Patrick), a white supremacist, former vigilante, and the father of Christopher Smith / Peacemaker who is disappointed that Chris works for the United States government and blames him for the accidental death of Auggie's eldest son Keith during a fight instigated by Auggie when Keith and Chris were children. Despite this, Auggie maintains a secret armory for Chris in his home. After Chris kills an alien "Butterfly" parasite disguised as a human and holds a couple hostage while working with Project Butterfly, his teammate John Economos frames Auggie for the crimes, leading the police to arrest him and send him to prison, where he is hailed as the "White Dragon" by most of the white prisoners. When Auggie threatens to expose Project Butterfly, Chris' friend Adrian Chase mounts an unsuccessful assassination attempt before Auggie provides proof of his innocence to the police and he is eventually released. Gathering his followers and donning a suit of power armor, which allows him to fly and shoot energy projectiles, Auggie tracks down Chris and prepares to kill him, having had enough of his son's antics. While Chase disables his weapons, Economos shoots and kills most of his followers. Realizing his father is a lost cause, Chris executes Auggie, but is later haunted by hallucinations of him.

White RabbitWhite Rabbit is the name of three different characters appearing in American comic books published by DC Comics.

Angora LapinAngora Lapin is a mysterious arms dealer that operates in Metropolis that operated as White Rabbit. She and her henchmen C&H, Dutch, and Mucus stole high-tech weaponry made by John Henry Irons called "Toastmasters" so that they can sell them to the gangs of Metropolis. When John Henry Irons first became "Man of Steel", his first job was to get the Toastmasters off the streets and defeat White Rabbit.

White Rabbit II
The second White Rabbit is an unnamed swordsman and mercenary who is a member of the Pentacle which antagonizes the Shadowpact.

Jaina Hudson
In 2011, "The New 52" rebooted the DC universe. Jaina Hudson was the child of a Bollywood actress and a diplomat named Tom Hudson. After spending time in private schools, Jaina attended a fundraiser where she met Bruce Wayne. When first seen as White Rabbit, she was among the Arkham Asylum inmates that escaped where she teased Batman and the Gotham City Police Department. When Batman caught up to White Rabbit near the scene of dead clowns, Joker draped a cloth over her. Batman fought Joker until it was discovered that Joker was actually Clayface in disguise. When Clayface fell on Batman, White Rabbit tried to inject a steroid into Batman only to be thwarted by Flash.

During the "Forever Evil" storyline, White Rabbit is among the villains that join the Crime Syndicate of America's incarnation of the Secret Society of Super Villains. She was present at Arkham Asylum when Bane arrived. When Bane caused a breakout at Arkham Asylum, White Rabbit went to Bar 8 and participated in many battles throughout Gotham City.

In 2016, DC Comics implemented another relaunch of its books called "DC Rebirth", which restored its continuity to a form much as it was prior to "The New 52". White Rabbit appeared as a member of the Wonderland Gang.

White Witch

Perry White

Wild Dog

Wildebeest

Wildfire

Wildstar

Rose Wilson

Windfall
Creators: Mike W. Barr and Jim Aparo. First appearance: Batman and the Outsiders #9 (April 1984). Powers: Aerokinesis and flight.Windfall was a young metahuman who gained her powers after her mother let her company perform prenatal DNA experiments on her and her sister Becky, causing Becky to eventually kill their mother in revenge later in life.Wendy Jones was originally a member of the supervillain group called the Masters of Disaster alongside her sister. She even fought the Outsiders on more than one occasion. During an attack against the Outsiders, she rescued one of their members. The team leader, Windfall's sister New Wave, was against Windfall helping Halo. This event caused Windfall to quit the team and join the Outsiders for a while. She later left adventuring with the Outsiders behind and continued with college.

During school, Wendy was invited to a fraternity party and date-raped by members of the fraternity after they spiked her drink with rohypnol. After taking turns with Wendy, the fraternity members took pictures and posted them on the Internet, while the local district attorney, the father of one of the fraternity members who ruined her, refused to make a case for Wendy due to her past as a supervillainess. As a result of the scandal, the college Wendy attended expelled her to avoid scrutiny, causing Wendy to return to the college and kill the fraternity members who ruined her by removing the air from their fraternity house and suffocating all the residents to death. Wendy was later incarcerated in Belle Reve for her murders before eventually being recruited by Amanda Waller for the Suicide Squad.

During a mission to the Middle East, the General betrayed the team and led a mutiny against them as well. After trying to make an air wall to protect the group from the attacks from Chemo, Windfall could not maintain the wall and was reduced to a skeleton.

Windfall in other media
 Windfall and the Masters of Disaster appear in the DC Nation Shorts: Thunder and Lightning episode "Lightning Under the Weather".
 Wendy Jones appears in Young Justice: Outsiders, voiced by Zehra Fazal. She is one of the meta-teen trafficking victims residing at the Meta-Human Youth Center in Taos, New Mexico.

Wing

Woozy Winks

Wintergreen

WinkWink is a young metahuman terrorist in the DC Universe, who was a member of the Suicide Squad and The Revolutionaries with the power of teleportation. She is dating The Aerie. Created by Tom Taylor and Bruno Redondo, she first appeared in Suicide Squad Volume 6 #1 (February 2020).

 Wizard 

Wolf SpiderWolf Spider is the name of a fictional character appearing in American comic books published by DC Comics.

Evan Blake is a rich playboy and old friend of Kate Kane that operates as the art thief Wolf Spider. Wolf Spider ran afoul of Batwoman when he tried stole paintings by a Depression-era artist named Eisenstadt where one of his works was actually a map to the location of the money that Eisenstadt stole from a crooked businessman named Grantham. He was actually hired by Grantham's grandson Nathan Grantham. When the map was obtained, Nathan was wounded when a statue fell on him causing Batwoman to allow Wolf Spider to get away with the money and not knowing of his identity. Despite his mission being a success, Wolf Spider disposed of the money in Slaughter Swamp as he considered it "blood money".

Wolf Spider in other media
Wolf Spider appears in the Batwoman episode "Gore on Campus", portrayed by Lincoln Clauss. This version is an old friend of Kate Kane who operates as an art thief. During the heist of the portrait made by Jack Napier, Wolf Spider is struck by the Crow vehicle pursuing him. As the Crows claimed the portrait, Ryan Wilder discovered that Evan is Wolf Spider and gave him to Mary to patch up. Mary later revealed to Evan that the portrait he was trying to steal was a fake. In the episode "Armed and Dangerous", Wolf Spider was enlisted by Mary to infiltrate Luke Fox's hospital room and administer the Desert Rose serum after Luke was shot by Russell Tavaroff.

Gregory WolfeGregory Wolfe''' is a fictional character appearing in American comic books published by DC Comics.

Gregory Wolfe is the prison warden of Iron Heights Penitentiary, and enemy of the Flash. He is able to cause muscle spasms, which aids him in keeping inmates in line.

Gregory Wolfe in other media
Gregory Wolfe appears in The Flash'', portrayed by Anthony Harrison in season one and by Richard Brooks in season four. This version has no metahuman abilities, is shown to be corrupt, and has connections with Amunet Black.

Wonder Boy

Wonder Girl

Donna Troy

Cassie Sandsmark

Wonder Twins

Wonder Woman

Wotan

Wrath

References

DC Comics characters: W, List of